The 2008 SEC softball tournament was held at Tiger Park on the campus of Louisiana State University in Baton Rouge, Louisiana from May 8 through May 10, 2008.  Florida won the tournament and earned the Southeastern Conference's automatic bid to the 2008 NCAA Division I softball tournament.

Tournament

 Arkansas, South Carolina and Kentucky did not make the tournament.  Vanderbilt does not sponsor a softball team.

All-Tournament Team
OF, Erinn Webb, Tennessee
IF, Tonya Callahan, Tennessee
IF, Shannon Stein, LSU
OF, Quinlan Duhon, LSU
P/DP, Charlotte Morgan (softball player), Alabama
IF, Whitney Larsen, Alabama
P, Kelsi Dunne, Alabama
IF, Ali Gardiner, Florida
OF, Francesca Enea, Florida
OF, Mary Ratliff, Florida
P, Stacey Nelson, Florida
MVP: P, Stacey Nelson, Florida

See also
Women's College World Series
NCAA Division I Softball Championship
SEC softball tournament
SEC Tournament

External links
2008 SEC softball tournament @ SECSports.com

References

SEC softball tournament
2008 Southeastern Conference softball season